Regis Corporation is an American operator of hair salons. As of August 2021, it has 5,563 franchised and 276 company-owned salons. Its headquarters are in Saint Louis Park, Minnesota.

The primary trade names Regis salons operates under are SmartStyle (located in Walmart stores), Supercuts (located in strip malls), Cost Cutters, First Choice Haircutters and Roosters Men's Grooming Center (Roosters).

Origins 

Regis was founded in 1922 by Paul and Florence Kunin as Kunin Beauty Salon, and renamed Regis in 1958 by their son Myron who acquired the chain.

Acquisitions and divestitures 
In 2005 the company acquired Hair Club for Men and Women, but sold it to the Japanese wigmaker Aderans in 2012. The company recently sold all of its beauty schools to Empire Beauty Schools.

On January 10, 2006, Regis Corporation announced it would acquire the Sally Beauty Company business of Alberto-Culver. Sally has 2,419 Sally Beauty Supply stores and 822 Beauty Systems Group stores. However, on April 5, 2006, Alberto-Culver terminated the merger agreement and later Sally was spun off as a separate company.

Regis acquired a major competitor The Barbers, Hairstyling for Men & Women, Inc., which had previously brought the companies: The Cost Cutters, Family Hair Care, City Looks Salons International and We Care Hair. Other major acquisitions included Sassoon and HCUK.  Regis sells Designline hair care products (2004) as well.

In October 2017 Regis Corporation sold its Regis Salons, MasterCuts, and UK Supercuts to The Beautiful Group.  These salons became franchises keeping the same brand names.

At the end of December 2019 Regis terminated its franchise agreements with The Beautiful Group and took back 200 salons with the stated intention of finding a new buyer.  The remaining salons are to be shut down.

References

External links 

 

Franchises
Hairdressing salon chains
American companies established in 1922
Retail companies established in 1922
Retail companies of the United States
Companies based in Edina, Minnesota
Companies listed on the New York Stock Exchange
1922 establishments in Minnesota